The BSA Road Rocket was a 1950s  air-cooled parallel twin motorcycle designed by Bert Hopwood and produced by Birmingham Small Arms Company (BSA) at Small Heath, Birmingham. Developed from the A10 Golden Flash it was the first sports bike in the BSA A10 series. The A10 had a reputation for reliability but was struggling to compete against the Triumph engines and the Norton Featherbed frames. Advertised by BSA in 1956 as 'undoubtedly the world's greatest motor cycle' the Road Rocket was discontinued in 1958 when it was replaced by the BSA Super Rocket.

Development

Launched as the top of BSA's range in 1954 the BSA Road Rocket was the first A10 engine with an alloy cylinder head. Unlike the Golden Flash, the inlet manifold was separate from the cylinder head enabling twin carburettors to be fitted if required. It had a single Amal TT carburettor as standard. 

The big-end size was increased from 1.48" to 1.68". It had high compression pistons and a higher lift camshaft with the 356 "sports" profile.

The model was launched with chrome mudguards and stays and a half-chrome petrol tank. A tachometer was an optional extra.

In 1957 an improved clutch was introduced, using 4 springs instead of six and improved friction material.

See also
List of motorcycles of the 1950s

References

Further reading
 
 
 
 

Road
Motorcycles introduced in 1954